Jill Pollard (born 21 July 1935) is a British gymnast. She competed in six events at the 1960 Summer Olympics.

References

1935 births
Living people
British female artistic gymnasts
Olympic gymnasts of Great Britain
Gymnasts at the 1960 Summer Olympics
Sportspeople from Bradford